Debora Greger (born 1949) is an American poet as well as a visual artist.

She was raised in Richland, Washington.
She attended the University of Washington and then the Iowa Writers' Workshop. She then went on to hold fellowships at the Fine Arts Work Center in Provincetown and at Harvard University's Radcliffe Institute for Advanced Study.  She was professor of English and creative writing at the University of Florida until retiring.> She now works as Poet in Residence at the Harn Museum of Art.

Her poetry has been included in six volumes of The Best American Poetry and she has exhibited her artwork at several galleries and museums across the country. She also has a poem on Poetry 180 in number 42. 
Her work appeared in Paris Review, The Nation, Poetry, and The New Criterion.

She lives in Gainesville, Florida and Cambridge, England with her life-partner, the poet and critic, William Logan.

Awards
2012: Aiken Taylor Award for Modern American Poetry
2004: John William Corrington Award for Literary Excellence, Centenary College
1996: Lenore Marshall Poetry Prize, Finalist
1991: National Endowment for the Arts Fellowship
1990: Award in Literature from the American Academy and Institute of Arts and Letters
1988: Brandeis University Poetry Award
1987: Academy of American Poets' Peter I.B. Lavan Award
1987: Fellowship from the John Simon Guggenheim Memorial Foundation
1985: National Endowment for the Arts Fellowship
1982: Amy Lowell Poetry Traveling Scholarship
1979: "Discovery"/The Nation Poetry Prize
1977: Fine Arts Work Center in Provincetown, Fellowship
1974: Grolier Prize in Poetry
Ingram Merrill Foundation Fellowship

Books
2017: In Darwin's Room. Penguin.
2012: By Herself. Penguin.
2008: Men, Women, and Ghosts. Penguin.
2004: Western Art. Penguin.
2001: God. Penguin.
1996: Desert Fathers, Uranium Daughters. Penguin.
1994: Off-Season at the Edge of the World. University of Illinois Press.
1990: The 1002nd Night. Princeton University Press.
1985: Blank Country (limited edition chapbook). Meadow Press.
1985: And. Princeton University Press.
1980: Cartography (limited edition chapbook). Penumbra Press.
1980: Movable Islands. Princeton University Press.

References

External links
University of Florida Faculty Listing

1949 births
University of Florida faculty
Living people
University of Washington alumni
University of Iowa alumni
Radcliffe fellows
Iowa Writers' Workshop alumni
American women poets
People from Walsenburg, Colorado
American women academics
21st-century American women